"Emotional Rescue" is a song by the English rock and roll band, the Rolling Stones. It was written by Mick Jagger and Keith Richards and is included on their 1980 album Emotional Rescue.

Recorded between June and October 1979, "Emotional Rescue" is a disco-influenced number, somewhat similar to the band's 1978 hit "Miss You". The song is notable as one of the earliest songs by the group to show the growing rift between Jagger and Richards. Although Richards plays guitar and added backing vocals towards the end of this track, he is believed to have disliked the disco-like direction in which Jagger was trying to take the band, although this may have been exaggerated by the media.

Composition and writing 
Mick Jagger wrote the song on an electric piano and from the beginning it was sung in falsetto (similar to Marvin Gaye's lead vocal on his 1977 hit "Got to Give It Up"). When the song was brought into the studio they kept the electric piano and falsetto lead. With Ronnie Wood on bass and Charlie Watts on drums they worked out the song. They then added the saxophone part played by Bobby Keys. Bass guitarist Bill Wyman plays synthesizer on the record, while Jagger and Ian Stewart play electric piano. Wyman's synthesizer can be heard faintly during the verses on the right channel/speaker and plays a simple pattern of a few notes using a string-synth set up.

Jagger said the song was about "a girl who's in some sort of manhood problems", not that she was going crazy but she's "just a little bit screwed up and he wants to be the one to help her out".

Released as the album's lead single on 20 June 1980, "Emotional Rescue" was well received by some fans. Other fans of the Rolling Stones' work took note of the change in direction and were disappointed by it.

Billboard said that "The hook is settled in the offbeat, but once it's repeated the tune becomes addicting."  Cash Box said that it was influenced by the music of "Curtis Mayfield and the Impressions, Thom Bell and (on the U.K. side) Eric Burdon," but is brought up-to-date by the "heavy beat." Record World said that "Jagger sings falsetto and street talks while the band cooks a raw, funky dance mix."

Despite touring extensively since the song's release in 1980, the Stones had never performed the track in concert until May 3, 2013, when the band debuted the song in their set list with a slightly different arrangement, during the first show of the 2013 leg of the 50 & Counting... tour, in Los Angeles, California.

Music video
Two music videos were produced to promote the single; one shot on traditional video, directed by David Mallet and one shot with thermal imaging, directed by Adam Friedman.

Personnel

The Rolling Stones
Mick Jagger – lead vocals, Wurlitzer electronic piano - electric guitar
Keith Richards – electric guitar
Ronnie Wood – bass guitar
Bill Wyman – string synthesizer
Charlie Watts – drums

Additional personnel
Ian Stewart – Wurlitzer electronic piano
Bobby Keys – saxophone

Charts

Weekly charts

Year end charts

References

The Rolling Stones songs
1980 singles
Songs written by Jagger–Richards
Song recordings produced by Jagger–Richards
1980 songs
Music videos directed by David Mallet (director)